Catoblepia magnalis is a butterfly of the family Nymphalidae, first described by Hans Ferdinand Emil Julius Stichel in 1902. It is found in Ecuador, South America

References 

Butterflies described in 1902
Nymphalidae of South America